The 1906 United States elections elected the members of the 60th United States Congress. It occurred in the middle of Republican President Theodore Roosevelt's second (only full) term, during the Fourth Party System. Republicans retained control of both houses of Congress.

Democrats won several seats in the House, but Republicans retained a solid majority in the chamber.

In the Senate, Republicans won moderate gains and maintained their commanding majority in the chamber.

This marked the most recent time in which a sitting two-term Republican president retained both chambers of Congress after his second midterm.

See also
1906 United States House of Representatives elections
1906–07 United States Senate elections
1906 United States gubernatorial elections

References

1906 elections in the United States
1906
United States midterm elections